I Love Wolffy is a 2012 Chinese animated adventure comedy film directed by Feng Zhu based on the animated television series Pleasant Goat and Big Big Wolf. The film was released on August 10, 2012. It was followed by the 2013 film I Love Wolffy 2.

Cast
Na Zhao
Ying Liang
Qing Zu
Quansheng Gao
Yuting Deng
Hongyun Liu
Yutong Zhu
Lin Zhang

Reception
The film earned  at the Chinese box office.

References

External links

Pleasant Goat and Big Big Wolf
Chinese animated films
2012 animated films
2012 films
Animated adventure films
Animated comedy films
2010s adventure comedy films
2012 comedy films
2010s Mandarin-language films